R616 road may refer to:
 R616 road (Ireland)
 R616 road (South Africa)